Pedro Vilardebó (16 October 1953 – 22 October 2004) was a Spanish racing cyclist. He rode in the 1978 Tour de France.

Major results
1977
 3rd Trofeo Masferrer
 4th Overall Escalada a Montjuich
1978
 1st Stage 3b Vuelta a los Valles Mineros
 3rd Overall Setmana Catalana de Ciclisme
 7th Overall Escalada a Montjuich
 9th GP Navarra
 10th Overall Volta a Catalunya
1979
 2nd Overall Volta a Catalunya
1st Stage 1
 2nd Overall Escalada a Montjuich
 3rd GP Villafranca de Ordizia
1980
 6th Overall Tour of the Basque Country
 9th Overall Vuelta a Andalucía

Grand Tour general classification results timeline

References

External links
 

1953 births
2004 deaths
Spanish male cyclists
People from Vallès Oriental
Sportspeople from the Province of Barcelona
Cyclists from Catalonia
20th-century Spanish people